Leon Airport  is a privately owned, public use airport located three nautical miles (6 km) south of the central business district of Leon, in Mason County, West Virginia, United States.

Facilities and aircraft 
Leon Airport covers an area of 10 acres (4 ha) at an elevation of 563 feet (172 m) above mean sea level. It has one runway designated 3/21 with a turf surface measuring 3,100 by 45 feet (945 x 14 m).

For the 12-month period ending July 1, 2012, the airport had 1,000 general aviation aircraft operations, an average of 83 per month. At that time there were 30 aircraft based at this airport: 93% ultralight and 7% single-engine.

See also 
 List of airports in West Virginia

References

External links 
 Aerial image as of September 1990 from USGS The National Map
 

Airports in West Virginia
Transportation in Mason County, West Virginia
Buildings and structures in Mason County, West Virginia